Mohammad, Mohammed, or Mohamed Ibrahim may refer to:

Sportspeople
 Mohammed Ibrahim (basketball), (born 1983), Lebanese professional basketball player
 Mohamed Ibrahim (weightlifter, born 1987) (Mohamed Abdeltawwab Ibrahim Abdelbaki; born 1987), Egyptian weightlifter
 Mohamed Ibrahim (snooker player), (born 1990), Egyptian snooker player
 Mohammad Ibrahim (cricketer) (born 1998), Afghan cricketer
 Mohamed Ibrahim (diver), Egyptian Olympic diver
 Mohamed Ibrahim (footballer, born 1985), Egyptian footballer
 Mohamed Ibrahim (footballer, born 1992), Egyptian footballer
 Mohammad Ibrahim (footballer, born 1997), Bangladeshi footballer
 Mohammed Ibrahim Saleh (born 1997), Emirati footballer
 Mohamed Ibrahim (gymnast) (born 1942), Egyptian gymnast
 Mohamed Mahmoud Ibrahim (born 1937), Egyptian Olympic weightlifter
 Mohamed Ibrahim (American football) (born 1998), American football player
 Mohammed Ibrahim Eid (born 1991), Emirati footballer
 Mohamed Ibrahim El-Sayed (born 1998), Egyptian Greco-Roman wrestler

Others
 Asad Khan, 17th-18th century Mughal noble with the birth name Muhammad Ibrahim 
 Muhammad Ibrahim (Mughal emperor) (1703–1746), Mughal Emperor
 Muhammad Ibrahim (justice) (1894–1966), Bengali justice and academic
 Muhammad Ibrahim (1911–1989), Bangladeshi physician, founder of BIRDEM
 Mohamed Ibrahim Warsame (born 1943), Somali poet and songwriter
 Muhammad Ibrahim (academic) (born 1945), Bangladeshi academic
 Mohammad Ibrahim Arman Loni (1983–2019), Pashtun human rights activist
 Mohamed Mohamud Ibrahim (born 1946 or 1947), deputy Prime Minister of Somalia 2011-
 Mo Ibrahim (born 1946), British telecommunications tycoon
 Mohamed Youssef Ibrahim (born 1947), former Egyptian Interior Minister
 Mohamed Ibrahim Moustafa (born 1953), Egyptian Interior Minister from January 2013 to March 2015
 Muhammad Ibrahim (actor) (born 1955), Lebanese actor, television presenter and voice actor
 Mohammed Ibrahim (renegade Taliban leader) (died 2006), defected from the Taliban in 2006, dying of chronic liver disease shortly afterwards
 Muhammad Ibrahim (banker), governor of the Central Bank of Malaysia

See also
 Mohammad Ibrahim Khan (disambiguation)
 Mohammed Ibrahim Makwai, an alias for Saif al-Adel, senior member of the al Qaeda leadership, sometimes described as al Qaeda's military chief